Giambattista Valli is an Italian fashion designer. He is from Rome, Italy. His collections, both ready to wear and Haute couture are presented semi-annually during Paris Fashion Week.

Early life
Born and raised in Rome, Giambattista Valli completed studies at a liceo (an Italian secondary school) and then earned a degree in art. In 1987 he began a foundation course in illustration at Central Saint Martins College of Art and Design in London.

Career

Early career
After stints at Roberto Capucci (1986–1990), Fendi (1990–1995) and Krizia (1995–1996), Valli moved to Paris and worked as Creative Director for Emanuel Ungaro from 1998 to 2004. Ungaro credited Valli with revitalizing the house, and named him as his successor when he retired in 2004. Shortly after, the Ferragamo family, which owned Ungaro, dismissed him during an internal struggle.

Giambattista Valli
Valli launched his eponymous brand in 2005, heralding his first ready-to-wear show in Paris where he had moved from Italy to realise his everlasting dream of creating a true “Maison”.

Giambattista Valli shows both ready-to-wear and haute couture collections semiannually in Paris. He is one of the few non-French designers granted membership into the historic Chambre Syndicate de la Haute Couture. He showed his first Couture collection in July 2011.  

Also since 2005, the brand has been working with MAC Cosmetics.

The brand is owned by Giambattista Valli, with a minority shareholding by Groupe Artémis since 2017. Its headquarters are located in historic building located on Rue Boissy d'Anglas which also houses its main store – designed by Luigi Scialanga – entirely dedicated to ready-to-wear collections, leather goods and accessories including shoes, bags and jewelry. The brand has flagship stores in Paris, London, Milan, Saint Tropez, Doha, Seoul and Beijing and is internationally distributed with more than 245 selling points.

With the expiration of a contract with Italian fur-maker Ciwifurs for the brand’s own fur coats and jackets, Giambattista Valli brought all production and distribution in-house in 2017.

By 2012, Giambattista Valli's ready-to-wear, couture and collaborations generated an estimated $80 million in sales annually.

Other brands
In 2014, Giambattista Valli launched Giamba, a new, younger sister ready-to-wear line, with a runway show in Milan.

In late 2014, Giambattista Valli designed a spring collection for 7 for All Mankind.

From 2008 to 2017 Giambattista Valli was Creative Director of Moncler Gamme Rouge, building a new language of refined activewear for the brand and expanding the horizons for the use of women’s puffer jackets.

In 2017, Giambattista Valli launched an activewear capsule collection, including coats, puffer jackets, sweatshirts and track suits.

In 2019, Giambattista Valli released a capsule collection for men and women with H&M, the first time he has branched out into menswear.

Recognition
Giambattista Valli is the recipient of a Star Honoree Award from Fashion Group International in 2011 in New York and Best Designer of the Year Awards from Elle China in 2013 and from Marie Claire Spain in 2015.

Clients
Giambattista Valli designs have been worn by actresses, models, and royalty including Sarah Jessica Parker, Sonam Kapoor, Hilary Swank, Demi Moore, Ariana Grande, Penélope Cruz, Jessica Biel, Reese Witherspoon, Naomi Campbell, Mary Kate Olsen, Doutzen Kroes, Iman, Queen Rania of Jordan, Sofia Carson Jelena Karleuša, Clotilde Courau Amal Clooney, Rihanna, Kendall Jenner and Gwyneth Paltrow. In 2019, he designed Charlotte Casiraghi's wedding dress.

References

External links

Official page

Fashion designers from Rome
Living people
1966 births